Vikavågen is a village in Øygarden municipality in Vestland county, Norway. The village lies on the southeastern coast of the island of Toftøyna.

References

Villages in Vestland
Øygarden